Vladimir Samuilovich Kirpichnikov (born July 4, 1948, in Riga) is a Soviet/Latvian chess FIDE Master (FM, 2023) who won the Latvian Chess Championship in 1974.

Chess career
Vladimir Kirpichnikov started to play chess at the age of 10. He achieved Soviet chess master title in 1968. In 1974 he shared first place with Juzefs Petkēvičs in Latvian Chess Championship and later both were declared champions.
In 1977 he won the Latvian master national tournament and participated in the next year international tournament in Jūrmala.
Vladimir Kirpichnikov played for Latvia in Soviet Team chess championships:
 In 1967, at boy board in the 10th Soviet Team chess championship in Moscow (+1 −2 =6);
 In 1975, at seventh board in the 13th Soviet Team chess championship in Riga (+0 −1 =4).
Vladimir Kirpichnikov played for Latvian team "Daugava" in Soviet Team chess cup:
 In 1968, at second boy board in the 6th Soviet Team chess cup in Riga (+4 −4 =3);
 In 1971, at fifth board in the 7th Soviet Team chess cup in Rostov-on-Don 4 from 6 (third place at board);
 In 1974, at third board in the 8th Soviet Team chess cup in Moscow (+3 −1 =5);
 In 1976, at third board in the 9th Soviet Team chess cup in Tbilisi (+0 −4 =2).

References

 Žuravļevs, N.; Dulbergs, I.; Kuzmičovs, G. (1980), Latvijas šahistu jaunrade, Rīga, Avots., pp. 36 – 38 (in Latvian).

External links
 
 
 
 
 

1948 births
Living people
Latvian chess players
Soviet chess players
Sportspeople from Riga
Latvian people of Russian descent
Chess FIDE Masters